Ivar Mauritz Aronsson (24 March 1928 – 6 February 2017) was a Swedish rower who competed in the 1956 Summer Olympics. He won a silver medal in the coxed fours and finished fourth in the eights competition. He won two silver medals in these events at the 1955 European Championships.

References

1928 births
2017 deaths
Swedish male rowers
Olympic rowers of Sweden
Rowers at the 1956 Summer Olympics
Olympic silver medalists for Sweden
Olympic medalists in rowing
Medalists at the 1956 Summer Olympics
European Rowing Championships medalists
20th-century Swedish people